Siksika 146 is a First Nations reserve of the Siksika Nation in southern Alberta, Canada.

Geography 
The locality of Siksika is on the Siksika 146 reserve. The reserve is bordered by Vulcan County, Wheatland County, and the County of Newell and is home to the Blackfoot Crossing historical park.

Demographics 
In the Canada 2011 Census, Siksika 146 recorded a population of 2,972.

References 

Indian reserves in Alberta
County of Newell
Wheatland County, Alberta
Vulcan County
Siksika Nation